Adrenocortical hyperfunction is a condition where there is an overexpression of products of the adrenal cortex. When cortisol is overproduced, it is called Cushing's syndrome. When aldosterone is overproduced, it is called hyperaldosteronism.

References

External links

Adrenal gland disorders